Graham Smith (born April 9, 1994) is an American professional soccer player.

Career

College & Youth
Smith played two years of college soccer at the University of Pittsburgh between 2012 and 2013, before transferring to the University of South Florida in 2014.

Central FC
Smith was one of a plurality of players flown in on three-week contracts to play for Trinidadian team Central FC in the 2017 Caribbean Club Championship. He started his club's first round in the competition against Grenades F.C. of the Grenada Premier Division and played in their match versus Dominican Republic side Cibao FC, earning a yellow card.

Professional
On March 15, 2018, Smith signed with United Soccer League club North Carolina FC.

References

1994 births
Living people
American expatriate soccer players
American expatriate sportspeople in Trinidad and Tobago
American soccer players
Association football midfielders
Central F.C. players
Expatriate footballers in Trinidad and Tobago
North Carolina FC players
People from New Hope, Pennsylvania
Pittsburgh Panthers men's soccer players
Reading United A.C. players
Soccer players from Pennsylvania
South Florida Bulls men's soccer players
Sportspeople from Bucks County, Pennsylvania
USL Championship players